Raymond Ibrahim (born 1973) is an American author, translator, columnist, critic of Islam and a former librarian. His focus is Arabic history and language, and current events. He is the author of four books, Defenders of the West: The Christian Heroes Who Stood Against Islam (Post Hill Press, 2022), Sword and Scimitar: Fourteen Centuries of War between Islam and the West (Da Capo, 2018), Crucified Again: Exposing Islam's New War on Christians (Regnery, 2013) and The Al Qaeda Reader (Doubleday, 2007).

Early life and education 
Ibrahim was born in the United States to Coptic immigrants from Egypt. He is fluent in Arabic and English. Ibrahim studied at California State University, Fresno, where he wrote a master's thesis under Victor Davis Hanson on an early military encounter between Islam and Byzantium based on medieval Arabic and Greek texts. Ibrahim also took graduate courses at Georgetown University's Center for Contemporary Arab Studies and studied toward a PhD in medieval Islamic history at Catholic University.

Career
Ibrahim was previously an Arabic language specialist for the Near East section of the Library of Congress, and the associate director of the Middle East Forum. He is currently the Distinguished Senior Shillman Fellow at the Gatestone Institute and the Judith Friedman Rosen Writing Fellow at the Middle East Forum, an American conservative think tank.

Ibrahim is the editor and translator of The Al Qaeda Reader, which he published after discovering a hitherto unknown Arabic al-Qaeda document; Ibrahim believes the document "proves once and for all that, despite the propaganda of al-Qaeda and its sympathizers, radical Islam's war with the West is not finite and limited to political grievances — real or imagined — but is existential, transcending time and space and deeply rooted in faith".

Ibrahim has appeared on and been interviewed by Al Jazeera, MSNBC, C-SPAN, NPR, and Reuters, and "regularly lectures, briefs governmental agencies, provides expert testimony for Islam-related lawsuits, and testifies before Congress." He has been identified as part of the counter-jihad movement.

Reception
An article Ibrahim wrote on taqiyya, which was commissioned and published by Jane's Islamic Affairs Analyst on September 26, 2008, was later characterized by another author in Jane's Islamic Affairs Analyst as being "well-researched, factual in places but ... ultimately misleading". Ibrahim responded to this charge in his rebuttal, "Taqiyya Revisited: A Response to the Critics.

Publications
 
 
 
 
 "How Taqiyya Alters Islam's Rules of War", Middle East Quarterly, Winter 2010, pp. 3–13
 "Are Judaism and Christianity as Violent as Islam?", Middle East Quarterly, Summer 2009, pp. 3–12
 "An Analysis of Al-Qa'ida's Worldview: Reciprocal Treatment or Religious Obligation", Middle East Review of International Affairs, Vol. 12, No. 3, September 2008
 "Studying the Islamic Way of War", National Review Online, September 11, 2008
 "Islam's Doctrines of Deception", Jane's Islamic Affairs Analyst, The Middle East Forum, September 26, 2008
 "Jesus and Mohammad, Version 2.0", National Review Online, September 10, 2007
 "The Two Faces of Al Qaeda", The Chronicle of Higher Education, Vol. 54, Issue 4, p. B3, September 21, 2007
 "Islam gets concessions; Infidels get conquered", Los Angeles Times, December 5, 2006

References

External links

 

1973 births
Living people
American critics of Islam
Middle Eastern studies in the United States
American people of Coptic descent
American people of Egyptian descent
California State University, Fresno alumni
Catholic University of America alumni
Christian critics of Islam
Counter-jihad activists